Yvonne Daphne Antrobus (born 1 November 1940) is a British novelist, abridger, radio dramatist, and actress.

Writing 

She has made over 100 abridgments and dramatisations for BBC Radio 3 and BBC Radio 4 and for independent audio publishers, including Vernon God Little by DBC Pierre, The British Journalist by Andrew Marr and Days From A Different World by John Simpson. She was awarded the Abridgers’ Silver Award by the Audio Book Association in 2003 for Churchill by Roy Jenkins. In 2009 BBC Radio 4 broadcast her series Diary of an On-Call Girl, based on the blogs and book by 'WPC Ellie Bloggs', the anonymous blogger who is also a serving British police officer.

Antrobus has written two crime novels: True to Form (1998) and Cut in the Ground (1999).

Acting 

Among Antrobus' television appearances are Dixon of Dock Green (1963), Redcap (1965), Emergency - Ward 10 (1967), The Benny Hill Show (1967), The First Churchills (1969), Z-Cars (1970), Steptoe and Son (1972), The Protectors (1973), Wessex Tales (1973), Within These Walls (1974), Thomas & Sarah (1979), The Bill (1989), The Chief (1990), and On Dangerous Ground (1996).

Antrobus' other work includes appearances in London's West End (she was the winner of a London Theatre Critics’ Award for Best Supporting Actress) and in the films Dr. Who and the Daleks (1965), The Pleasure Girls (1965), Mister Quilp (1975), and was interviewed as herself in the 1995 Dalek-film documentary Dalekmania. Antrobus was unavailable for post-synchronisation after the shooting of Dr. Who and the Daleks was complete. So, while she is seen on-screen as Dyoni, her voice is provided by another, unnamed actress.

Filmography

References

External links
 Antrobus on the Internet Movie Database
 

1940 births
English television actresses
English film actresses
English stage actresses
English women novelists
English radio writers
Women radio writers
Living people
People from Cheltenham
20th-century English novelists
20th-century English women writers